Sheykh Kheyri (also Romanized as Sheykh Kheyrī) is a village in Margha Rural District, in the Central District of Izeh County, Khuzestan Province, Iran. At the 2006 census, its population was 20, in 4 families.

References 

Populated places in Izeh County